Patrick Joseph Egan (14 June 1876 – 28 April 1960) was an Irish Cumann na nGaedheal politician. He was first elected to Dáil Éireann as a Cumann na nGaedheal Teachta Dála (TD) for the Leix–Offaly constituency at the 1923 general election. He lost his seat at the June 1927 general election.

References

1876 births
1960 deaths
Cumann na nGaedheal TDs
Members of the 4th Dáil
People educated at Clongowes Wood College